Peter Reusse (15 February 1941 – 11 June 2022) was a German actor. He appeared in more than seventy films since 1961.

Selected filmography

References

External links 

1941 births
2022 deaths
German male film actors
German male stage actors
People from Potsdam-Mittelmark